Ewa Kasprzyk  née Witkowska (born 7 September 1957, in Poznań) is a retired Polish sprinter who competed primarily in the 200 metres. She represented her country at the first two editions of the World Championships, in 1983 and 1987, reaching the final both times.

She is the Polish record holder in 100 and 200 metres.

International competitions

1Did not start in the semifinals

2Representing Europe

Personal bests
Outdoors
100m 10.93 (Grudziądz 1986)
200m 22.13 (Moscow 1986)
400m 51.30 (1986)

Indoors
60m 7.26 (1988)
200m 22.69 (Budapest 1988)

External links

1957 births
Living people
Polish female sprinters
Sportspeople from Poznań
Goodwill Games medalists in athletics
European Athletics Championships medalists
World Athletics Championships athletes for Poland
Universiade bronze medalists for Poland
Universiade medalists in athletics (track and field)
Medalists at the 1977 Summer Universiade
Competitors at the 1986 Goodwill Games